Alexander Naumovich Mitta (born 28 March 1933 in Moscow) is a Soviet and Russian film director, screenwriter and actor.

Mitta's birth name was Alexander Naumovich Rabinovich. He studied engineering (graduated in 1955), then worked as a cartoonist in art and humour magazines. In 1960 Mitta graduated at the film directing faculty of the VGIK.

Mitta's career as film director and screenwriter spans from the 1960s until the 2010s. Among the movies are Shine, Shine, My Star (1970)  about actors trying to survive and work during the time of the Russian revolution or the high budget catastrophe movie Air Crew (1979). For his work Mitta obtained numerous awards in the Soviet Union and Russia.

In 1980, Mitta was a member of the jury at the 30th Berlin International Film Festival.

Mitta supported the Russian annexation of Crimea in 2014, even though he also noted that he didn't like that it serves as a distraction for many from other problems Russia is facing.

Filmography

Director
1961: My Friend, Kolka!
1962: No Fear, No Blame
1965: They're Calling, Open the Door
1969: Shine, Shine, My Star
1972: Dot, Dot, Comma...
1974: Moscow, My Love
1976: How Czar Peter the Great Married Off His Moor
1979: Air Crew
1982: The Story of Voyages
1988: A Step
1991: Lost in Siberia
2000: The Border. Taiga Romance
2002: Red-hot Saturday
2004: Swan Paradise
2013: Chagall — Malevich

Actor
1967: July Rain - Vladik
1998:  - Kapitän II
2010: Дом Cолнца - Posetitel vystavki Koreytsa (final film role)

Film school
In the 2000s Mitta began a film school.

References

External links
  
 
 Biographies in Russian: , .

1933 births
People's Artists of Russia
Russian caricaturists
Russian Jews
Russian film directors
Soviet film directors
Soviet screenwriters
Male screenwriters
Living people
Russian artists
Honorary Members of the Russian Academy of Arts
Academicians of the Russian Academy of Cinema Arts and Sciences "Nika"
Academic staff of High Courses for Scriptwriters and Film Directors
20th-century Russian Jews